Sigvard Emanuel "Sigge" Parling (26 March 1930 – 17 September 2016) was a Swedish football player. He also played ice hockey and bandy.

During his career he played for Djurgårdens IF (1949–1960), IK Sirius (1960–1963) and Gefle IF (1963–1965). His position was left midfielder and was considered a very rough but fair player. During his time in Djurgården he was known as the first Järnkamin (Iron Stove). Parling was capped 195 times for Djurgården and scored 12 goals. He won the Swedish Championship twice with Djurgårdens IF, 1955 and 1959.
Parling was part of the legendary Swedish national team at the 1958 FIFA World Cup and was capped 37 times for his country.

Parling is the only player from Djurgårdens IF who has played a World Cup Final. He died on 17 September 2016 at the age of 86.

Honours 
 Djurgårdens IF 
 Allsvenskan: 1954–55, 1959

References

1930 births
2016 deaths
1958 FIFA World Cup players
Djurgårdens IF Fotboll players
Swedish footballers
Sweden international footballers
Allsvenskan players
IK Sirius Fotboll players
Gefle IF players
Sandvikens AIK Fotboll players
IK Sirius players
Association football midfielders
Swedish football managers
Gefle IF managers
IK Sirius Fotboll managers
Hedesunda IF players
Swedish bandy players